Martinair Flight 138 was a chartered flight from Surabaya, East Java, Indonesia, to Colombo, Sri Lanka. The aircraft was operated by the Dutch airline Martinair on behalf of Garuda Indonesia. On 4 December 1974, the aircraft, a McDonnell Douglas DC-8-55CF, crashed into a mountain shortly before landing, killing all 191 people aboard – 182 Indonesian hajj pilgrims bound for Mecca, and nine crew members. The crash remains the deadliest in Sri Lankan aviation history and the third-deadliest involving a DC-8, after Arrow Air Flight 1285 and Nigeria Airways Flight 2120. At the time, it was the second-deadliest aviation accident in history, after the loss of Turkish Airlines Flight 981 which occurred earlier that same year.

Flight 138 departed Juanda International Airport in Surabaya at approximately 12.03 UTC, with a stopover at Bandaranaike Airport in Colombo. At around 16.30 UTC air traffic control in Colombo cleared the flight. The crew aboard Flight 138 were then asked to report when the airport was in sight.

Aircraft and crew 
The aircraft was a McDonnell Douglas DC-8 which carried the registration PH-MBH built in 1966. It was fitted with Pratt and Whitney engines which were modified by KLM. The aircraft was owned by the Dutch company Martinair.

The crew of Flight 138 was Captain Hendrik Lamme, First Officer Robert Blomsma, Flight Engineer Johannes Wijnands, Purser Ingrid van der Vliet and Flight Attendants Henrietta Borghols, Abdul Hamid Usman, Lilik Herawati, Titia van Dijkum, and Hendrika van Hamburg.

Location 

The aircraft crashed on the fifth mountain of a range of hills known as "Saptha Kanya" at Therberton estate, Maskeliya, Sri Lanka. It crashed at around 40 nautical miles from Bandaranaike International Airport, Katunayake.

Cause 
Investigators listed the cause of the accident to be a "collision with rising terrain as the crew descended the aircraft below safe altitude owing to incorrect identification of their position vis-a-vis the airport. The investigation is of the opinion that this was the result of dependence on Doppler and Weather Radar Systems on board PH-MBH which left room for misinterpretation."

Events leading to the accident 
The aircraft took off from Surabaya International airport Indonesia at approximately 1200 hours on 4 December 1974 to proceed to Jeddah, Saudi-Arabia with a programmed stop at Bandaranaike Airport, near Colombo.

This message was acknowledged by the crew but there was no further communication with the aircraft. Eyewitnesses stated that the plane was flying at a level below normal and there was no evidence of a fire on board and all the engines sounded normal with no malfunctions evident. The sound of the aircraft exploding on impact was heard clearly by residents close to the site of the crash.

Later it was discovered that the aircraft had crashed into the fifth mountain.

Repeated attempts to make contact with the aircraft from approach control met with no success and in consultation with Colombo area control the distress phase was initiated. Search and rescue operations began subsequently. The country of registry of the aircraft (The Netherlands) and the country of manufacture (USA) were informed. Indonesia was also informed of the accident as many of the passengers were nationals of that country.

Memorial 

A small memorial has been built in the town of Norton Bridge, which is several miles from the crash site.
In addition, a tire which was recovered from the crash site has been put on display to the public. The tire, even though displayed in public, remains property of the Norton Bridge Police. Sri Lankan artist Anton Jones sang about the incident in his song "DC8."
A second memorial, placed by family members from Asia and Europe, has been put on the slopes below the place of accident. Approximately 30 years after the accident, Martinair added a plaquette with only the eight names of the crew. On the Lelystad Airfield a memorial has been placed as well. The reason for this location is unknown.

See also 
 Icelandic Airlines Flight 001

References

External links 
 "Report on the accident to Martinair DC-8 PH-MBH on 4th December 1974 at Theberton Estate, Maskeliya, Sri Lanka."   ASN Aircraft accident Douglas DC-8-55F PH-MBH Maskeliya - Posted on the website of the Aviation Safety Network (ASN)
 "Report on the Accident to Martinair DC 8 PH-MBH on 4th December 1974 at Theberton Estate, Maskeliya, Sri Lanka." Sri Lanka Ministry of Transport Department of Civil Aviation (Archive) - Posted on the website of the Civil Aviation Authority of Sri Lanka

Aviation accidents and incidents in Sri Lanka
Aviation accidents and incidents in 1974
1974 in Sri Lanka
Accidents and incidents involving the Douglas DC-8
138
December 1974 events in Asia
1974 disasters in Sri Lanka